The 2012 Super League season (known as the Stobart Super League XVII) was the 17th season of rugby league football since the Super League format was introduced in 1996. Fourteen teams competed for the League Leaders' Shield over 27 rounds (including the Magic Weekend at Manchester's Etihad Stadium), which was won by the Wigan Warriors. After the regular season, the 8 highest finishing teams entered the play-offs to compete for a place in the Grand Final and a chance to win the championship and the Super League Trophy.

The season kicked off on 3 February with two Round 1 fixtures being played: the Widnes Vikings, in their first Super League match since 2005, lost to the Wakefield Trinity Wildcats, while defending champions the Leeds Rhinos defeated the Hull Kingston Rovers and ended on 6 October with Leeds Rhinos beating Warrington Wolves 26-18 in the 2012 Super League Grand Final.

Teams
Super League XVII was the first year of the second round of Super League licences. Under this system, promotion and relegation between Super League and Championship was abolished, and 14 teams were granted licences subject to certain criteria. All existing Super League teams except Crusaders (who pulled out of the application process) earned a place in the 2012 season, Championship team Widnes Vikings were given a licence after their application was deemed better than Halifax and Barrow Raiders.

Geographically, the vast majority of teams in Super League are based in the north of England, five teams – Warrington, St. Helens, Salford, Wigan and Widnes – to the west of the Pennines in Cheshire, Greater Manchester and Merseyside, and seven teams to the east in Yorkshire – Huddersfield, Bradford, Wakefield Trinity, Leeds, Castleford, Hull F.C. and Hull Kingston Rovers. Catalans Dragons are the only team based in France and are outside of the UK and London Broncos are the only team to be based in a capital city (London).

The maps below indicate the locations of teams that competed in Super League XVII.

Dragons

Broncos

Vikings

Saints

Wolves

Warriors

Reds

Hull

Hull KR

Tigers

Rhinos

Wildcats

Bulls

Giants

Rules

Rule changes
Teams will now only be able to make 10 interchanges in a match which has been reduced from 12.
If a player in possession of the ball hits the corner flag he will no longer be deemed 'In Touch'.
After a try, teams now have the option of taking the conversion as a drop-kick instead of from a tee.

Operational rules
 All Super League clubs agreed to operate within the £1.7million salary cap for their top 25 first-tier players.
 Quota spots were reduced to 5, meaning only 5 players could be from abroad. However, players from France, Samoa, Tonga and Papua New Guinea all count as federation-trained and thus do not count against the quota.

Table

Play-offs

The play-offs commenced following the conclusion of the 27-round regular season. To decide the grand finalists from the top eight finishing teams, Super League uses its unique play-off system. The finals concluded with the 2012 Super League Grand Final.

Season statistics

Top try-scorers

Top try assists

Top goalscorers

Top points scorers

Discipline

Awards
Awards are presented for outstanding contributions and efforts to players and clubs in the week leading up to the Super League Grand Final:
 Man of Steel: Sam Tomkins (Wigan Warriors)
 Coach of the year: Mick Potter (Bradford Bulls)
 Engage Super League club of the year: Wigan Warriors
 Young player of the year: Zak Hardaker (Leeds) Rhinos
 Carnegie community player of the year: Danny McGuire (Leeds Rhinos)
 Frontline Fairplay Index winners:
 Metre-maker: James Roby (St Helens) - 3,971 metres
 Hit Man: Danny Washbrook (Wakefield Trinity Wildcats) - 991 Tackles
 Mike Gregory Spirit of Rugby League Award: Jamie Peacock (Leeds Rhinos)
 Lifetime Achievement: Ryan Hudson, Ben Jeffries and Danny Orr

Media

Television
2012 is the first year of a five-year contract with Sky Sports to televise 70 matches per season. The deal which runs until 2016 is worth £90million.

Sky Sports coverage in the UK see two live matches broadcast each week – one on Friday night, which kicks-off at 8:00 pm and another usually on Saturday evenings at 5:45 pm, although for 2012, some matches between May and August will be scheduled for Monday nights at 8:00 pm, filling the gap vacated by the summer break of Premier League football. Regular commentators were Eddie Hemmings and Mike Stephenson with summarisers including Phil Clarke, Shaun McRae, Brian Carney, Barrie McDermott and Terry O'Connor.  Sky will broadcast highlights this season in a new show on Sunday Nights called Super League - Full Time, usually airing at 10pm.

BBC Sport broadcast a highlights programme called the Super League Show, presented by Tanya Arnold. The BBC show two weekly broadcasts of the programme. The first is only to the BBC North West, Yorkshire & North Midlands, North East & Cumbria, and East Yorkshire & Lincolnshire regions on Monday evenings at 11:35pm on BBC One, while a repeat showing is shown on BBC Two in the early hours of Tuesday morning. The Super League Show is also available for one week after broadcast for streaming or download via the BBC iPlayer in the UK only. End of season play-offs are shown on BBC Two across the whole country in a weekly highlights package.

Internationally, Super League is shown live or delayed on Showtime Sports (Middle East), Māori Television (New Zealand), TV 2 Sport (Norway), NTV+ (Russia), Fox Soccer Plus (United States), Eurosport (Australia) or SportsNet World (Canada).

Radio
BBC Coverage:

 BBC Radio 5 Live Sports Extra (National DAB Digital Radio) normally carry one Super League commentary a week on Friday Nights.
 BBC Manchester will carry commentary of Wigan and Salford whilst sharing commentary of Warrington with BBC Merseyside.
 BBC Humberside will have full match commentary of all Hull KR and Hull matches.
 BBC Leeds carry commentaries featuring Bradford, Leeds, Castleford, Wakefield and Huddersfield.
 BBC Merseyside (AM/DAB only) will have commentary on St Helens and Widnes matches whilst sharing commentary of Warrington with BBC Manchester.
 BBC London 94.9 airs all London Broncos games home & away, mainly via online streaming only.

Commercial Radio Coverage:

 102.4 Wish FM will carry commentaries of Wigan & St Helens matches.
 107.2 Wire FM will carry commentaries on Warrington & Widnes Matches.
 BCB 106.6 (Bradford Community Broadcasting) have full match commentary of Bradford Bulls home and away.
 Yorkshire Radio increases its coverage to air 50 games in the 2012 season.
 Radio Warrington (Online Station) all Warrington home games and some away games.
 Grand Sud FM covers every Catalans Dragons Home Match (in French).
 Radio France Bleu Roussillon covers every Catalans Dragons Away Match (in French).

All Super League commentaries on any station are available via the particular stations on-line streaming.

Internet
ESPN3 has worldwide broadband rights.

Starting from Thursday 9 April 2009, all of the matches shown on Sky Sports will also be available live online via Livestation everywhere in the world excluding the US, Puerto Rico, UK, Ireland, France, Monaco, Australia and New Zealand. List of Super League games available on Livestation.com

References

External links
Official Site
Super League XVII at Guardian

 
2012 in English rugby league
2012 in French rugby league